Weltmeister (German for World Champion) may refer to

 Music instruments by VEB Klingenthaler Harmonikawerke
 Weltmeister (marque) - A Chinese car brand of WM Motors
 The World Champion (German: Der Weltmeister), a 1919 German silent film